Trimellitic anhydride is an organic compound with the formula HO2CC6H3(C2O3).  It is the cyclic anhydride of trimellitic acid.  Several thousand tons of this colorless solid are produced annually as a precursor to plasticizers for polyvinyl chloride.  It is produced by air-oxidation of 1,2,4-trimethylbenzene.

References

Tricarboxylic acids